Adzhigardak is the name of a mountain in south Urals near Asha (town) on the border of Chelyabinsk oblast and Bashkiria, Russia, and of a ski resort based on it.

External links
Skiing in The Urals on Russia-IC

Mountains of Bashkortostan
Landforms of Chelyabinsk Oblast
Ski areas and resorts in Russia